Sri Lanka has several traditional games and sports, many of which are played during the Aluth Avurudda festival. Some of these games are similar to other traditional South Asian games.

Traditional games

Ankeliya 
In Ankeliya, two horns are attached to a strong tree, and then a rope is thrown across both horns. Two teams tug at the opposite ends of the rope until one of the horns breaks off.

Batta 
Batta is a form of hopscotch in which players must hop through various boxes while moving a stone forward through the boxes. Stepping on the ground with a disallowed foot, stepping on the lines between the boxes, or moving the stone into a disallowed area causes a player to lose.

Elle

Gudu keliya 
Gudu keliya is a variation of gilli-danda in which one player attempts to knock a small stick on the ground up into the air by hitting it with a longer stick held in the hand, and then tries to hit the small stick as far as possible. Opponents can catch the small stick before it touches the ground to make the hitter lose.

Kotta Pora 
Kotta Pora is a pillow-fighting game in which two opponents sit on top of a pole which is balanced off the ground. Both players must keep one hand behind their back and, using a pillow held with the other hand, attempt to knock the opponent off the pole.

Kana Mutti Bindima 
Players must attempt to break water-filled pots that are suspended off the ground with a stick while blindfolded.

Porapol gaseema 
In this game, the players of two teams throw coconuts at each other, and use their own coconuts to block the coconuts thrown at them. As the game progresses, some of the coconuts eventually break, and by the end of the game, the team with the most intact coconuts wins.

Variations of tag

Chak-gudu 
Chak-gudu is a variation of kabaddi.

Kili Thadthu 
Kili Thadthu (related to the Tamil game of Killithattu) is a game in which two teams of six players compete in periods of seven minutes, with the teams alternating offense and defense in each period. To score, the attacking team's players must make it across the entire field without being tagged by the defensive players, who stand on lines drawn horizontally across the field.

Martial arts

Cheena di

Angampora

Board games

Olinda keliya 
Olinda keliya is a form of mancala.

Peralikatuma

References 

Traditional Sri Lankan sports